The men's sanda 60 kg at the 2002 Asian Games in Busan, South Korea was held from 10 to 13 October at the Dongseo University Minseok Sports Center.

12 men from 12 countries competed in this event, limited to fighters whose body weight was less than 60 kilograms.

Liu Zedong from China won the gold medal after beating Kim Gwee-jong of the South Korea in gold medal bout 2–0, The bronze medal was shared by Vanxay Oudomphon and Vichan Toonkratork.

Schedule
All times are Korea Standard Time (UTC+09:00)

Results
Legend
KO — Won by knockout
RET — Won by retirement

References

2002 Asian Games Report, Page 791
Results

External links
Official website

Men's sanda 60 kg